Abdullah Mohamed Hassan (Arabic:عبد الله محمد حسن) (born 3 February 1995) is an Emirati footballer who plays for Masfout as a goalkeeper.

Career

Al-Shabab
Abdullah Mohamed started his career at Al-Shabab and is a product of the Al-Shabab's youth system. On 13 May 2017, made his professional debut for Al-Shabab against Al-Wahda in the Pro League .

Al Dhafra
On 28 July 2017 left Al-Shabab and signed with Al-Dhafra .

Al Dhaid
On Season 2018, left Al-Dhafra and signed with Al Dhaid.

References

External links
 

1995 births
Living people
Emirati footballers
Al Shabab Al Arabi Club Dubai players
Al Dhafra FC players
Al Dhaid SC players
Dibba FC players
Masfout Club players
UAE Pro League players
UAE First Division League players
Association football goalkeepers
Place of birth missing (living people)